Yongin Mireu Stadium is a multi-purpose stadium located Yongin, South Korea. It was formerly named Yongin Civic Sports Park but was changed to Yongin Mireu Stadium on 1 July 2020.

History 
Yongin Civic Sports Park was opened on January 1, 2018. 2019 AFC Women's Club Championship was held at Yongin Civic Sports Park.

References

External links
 Official website 

Football venues in South Korea
Athletics (track and field) venues in South Korea
Multi-purpose stadiums in South Korea
Buildings and structures in Yongin
Sports venues in Gyeonggi Province
Sports venues completed in 2017
Sport in Yongin